LIVE! is the first official live album by Canadian indie rock group the New Pornographers. It was released in 2006 as a tour-only release, and later sold through the band's web store.

Track listing
All songs by A. C. Newman except where noted.
 "The End of Medicine"  – 2:20
 "Use It" – 3:20
 "Jackie, Dressed in Cobras" (Dan Bejar) – 3:00
 "The Laws Have Changed" – 3:28
 "Testament to Youth in Verse" (Dan Bejar) – 3:48
 "These Are the Fables" – 3:29
 "From Blown Speakers" – 2:36
 "Streets of Fire" (Dan Bejar) – 2:32
 "It's Only Divine Right" – 3:37
 "The Fake Headlines" – 2:32
 "Execution Day" (Dan Bejar) – 3:07
 "Sing Me Spanish Techno" – 4:36
 "Dreams" (Stevie Nicks) – 27:11
 Unlisted. The song begins after 23:20 of silence.

Personnel
A. C. Newman – vocals, guitar
Kurt Dahle – drums, vocals
John Collins – bass
Todd Fancey – guitar, vocals
Blaine Thurier – keyboards, harmonica
Kathryn Calder – keyboards, vocals
Neko Case – vocals
Dan Bejar – vocals

External links

The New Pornographers live albums
2006 live albums